Euceraphis is a genus of true bugs belonging to the family Aphididae.

The species of this genus are found in Europe and Northern America.

Species:
 Euceraphis betulae (Koch, 1855) 
 Euceraphis betulijaponicae (Matsumura, 1919) 
 Euceraphis punctipennis (Zetterstedt, 1828)

References

Aphididae